The Liberian Women's Social and Political Movement was a Liberian women's organization founded by Sarah Simpson-George in 1946.

History
Sarah Simpson-George was a Liberian educator. She was the sister of Clarence Lorenzo Simpson, William Tubman's (19th President of Liberia) first vice president, and the wife of Samuel D. George, MP for Montserrado County. Encouraged by visiting the United States for a NCNW Wartime Workshop in 1944, she published 'An Open Letter to the Women of Liberia' in Monrovia's Weekly Mirror newspaper on her return, and founded the Liberian Women's Social and Political Movement in 1946. The Movement announced its purpose as follows:

The Liberian Women's Social and Political Movement took part in that year's NCNW annual convention, sending Mary McCritty Fiske as official delegate. In the years that followed it pressed for women to be allowed to serve on juries, which was achieved in 1949, and to be elected to public office, which was achieved in a 1951 constitutional amendment.

Papers relating to the Liberian Women's Social and Political Movement survive among the William V. S. Tubman papers and have been digitized.

References

Organizations established in 1946
Women's organizations based in Liberia
Organizations based in Liberia
1946 in Liberia
Women's rights in Liberia